Anarestan Rural District is a rural district (dehestan) in Kuhchenar County, Fars Province, Iran. At the 2006 census, its population was 11,070, in 2,414 families.  The rural district has 18 villages.

References 

Rural Districts of Fars Province
Kazerun County